Eucalyptus × laseronii is a species of small tree that is endemic to a restricted area of New South Wales. It has rough fibrous bark on its trunk smooth bark that is shed in long strips above, lance-shaped leaves, flower buds with a pointed, conical operculum and hemispherical fruit. It is considered to be a natural hybrid between E. caliginosa and E. stellulata. It was first described in 1913 from a specimen collected from Black Mountain near Guyra by "Mr. Laseron".

References

Flora of New South Wales
laseronii
Myrtales of Australia
Plants described in 1913
Plant nothospecies